Slavena Vatova (born 1989) is a Bulgarian model who won the title of Miss Bulgaria in 2006.

In 2005, Slavena won the Miss Black Sea contest and a year later in 2006 she was selected as Miss Bulgaria. She represented her country at Miss World 2006. In 2019, she became part of the jury in the program Bulgaria's got talent.

References

External links

Living people
Bulgarian female models
Miss World 2006 delegates
1989 births
Bulgarian beauty pageant winners